Chihara is a surname. Notable people with the surname include:

 Charles Chihara (1932–2020), American philosopher
 Minori Chihara (born 1980), Japanese voice actress and J-pop singer
 Paul Chihara (born 1938), American composer
 Theodore Seio Chihara (born 1929), American mathematician
Chihara polynomials (disambiguation)